Jerzy Klinger (April 15, 1918 – February 3, 1976) was a Polish Orthodox priest, theologian, professor and vice rector of the Christian Theological Academy in Warsaw.

References

Eastern Orthodox Christians from Poland
Clergy from Warsaw
1918 births
1976 deaths